The following lists events that happened during 1501 in India.

Incumbents
Prabhat Ray, founder and ruler of the Jaintia Kingdom, 1500–1516
Miran Adil Khan II, Sultan of the Faruqi dynasty, 1457–1501
Rudra Pratap Singh, Raja of Orchha State, 1501-1531
Dhanya Manikya, Maharaja of Tripura, 1463-1515

Events
The 2nd Portuguese India Armada (Cabral, 1500) left India in January
The 3rd Portuguese India Armada (Nova, 1501), funded by Bartolomeo Marchionni, landed in India in August
The Portuguese Armada fought the navy of the Zamorin of Calicut in the First Battle of Cannanore on 31 December
Pedro Álvares Cabral left India on 16 January and returned to Portugal with pepper, ginger, cinnamon, cardamom, nutmeg, mace, and cloves.  The profits made from this trip were huge.
Guru Nanak made his first Udaasis, stopping in Gwarighat on the way back
Mallabairegowda built Devanahalli Fort 
Rudra Pratap Singh founded Orchha State

Sikandar Lodi conquered Dholpur in Rajasthan
Portuguese tried to conquer Diu Island but failed
Dhanya Manikya constructed the Tripura Sundari Temple in Udaipur, Tripura
Nilakantha Somayaji wrote Tantrasamgraha, an important astronomical treatise
The Jain manuscript Devasanpada Kalpasutra was written

Deaths
Miran Adil Khan II, Sultan of the Faruqi dynasty
Ali-Shir Nava'i, who extensively influenced India, died on 9 February in Herat, Timurid Empire

See also

Timeline of Indian history

References

 
India
Years of the 16th century in India
1500s in India
India